The SLAM (Sistema Lanzacohetes de Artillería Múltiple, or Multiple Rocket Launcher System) "Pampero" is an Argentinian multiple rocket launcher (a type of rocket artillery) from Cold War and modern eras.

Development
The SLAM "Pampero" MRL was developed by CITEFA in 1980–1983, and was subsequently manufactured during the early 1980s by the DGFM “Fabrica Militar Fray Luis Beltran” in Rosario, Argentina. It is composed by a 16-tube launcher mounted on an Unimog 416 4x4 truck. The ammunition consists of 105mm "Pampero" artillery rockets, also developed by CITEFA, which can be armed with a variety of warheads. A total of five "Pampero" launchers on UNIMOG 416 chassis were built for the Argentine Army in 1983 (one of them the prototype and the others four for actual use).

Service history
The self-propelled variant is currently in service with the Argentine Army artillery branch.

Production progressed to the CP-30 MRL, which is able to use either the 105mm rockets from the Pampero or the new 127mm rockets, also called CP-30. This MRL is mounted in IVECO Trakker 6x4 trucks, in a similar way to the soviet Katyushas.

Variants
 Surface-Surface: self-propelled 16-tube MRL, mounted on top of a Mercedes-Benz Unimog 416 chassis.
 Air-Surface: 4 or 6-tube "Yaguareté" pod. 6-tube pod "Microbio".

Specifications

Rocket
 Caliber: 
 Length: 
 Motor: Solid-fuel rocket
 Weight:  
 Maximum range:  
 Dispersion: 68% of projectiles within an area of 300 m by 200 m
 Warhead:
 Types: Rocket Types: HE, HE-I (HE-Incendiary), Inert (for training).
 Weight: 

(NOTE: some specifications differ slightly from source to source)

Launcher
 Entered service: 1980s (Argentine Army)
 First used in action: ?
 Chassis: Mercedes-Benz Unimog 416 4x4 truck
 Crew: ? 
 Weight loaded: 6110 kg
 Length: ? m (? Ft ?? in)
 Width: ? m
 Height (stowed): ? m
 Height (max elevation): ? m
 Max road speed: ? km/h
 Cruise range: ? km
 Engine: ?
 Transmission: ?
 Number of tubes: 16
 Launch Rate: 16 rockets in 7.5 seconds
 Reload time: 10 minutes
 Loader Type: Manual
 Launcher Drive: Electric
 Launcher Traverse: 90°
 Launcher Elevation: 0 to +52°
 Average unit cost: ?

Users
 Argentine Army

See also 
 Artillery rockets, in "List of artillery"
 Argentina, in "List of artillery by country"
 Multiple rocket launcher

References

Notes

Sources

Further reading

External links
 Official Argentine Army website - Artillery Branch, field artillery equipment webpage (specifications and picture).
 Official website of the Argentine Army 3rd Artillery Group (page with picture and basic specifications)
 Official CITEFA website (Air-Surface version pictures with some specifications)
 Unofficial website (providing Description, Pictures and Specifications)
 Unofficial website (with organization and equipment of the Argentine Army, including details on the “Pampero”)
 Unofficial website (providing Specifications, with some differences)
  Description and specifications, Fabricaciones Militares website (accessed 2016-10-27)

Rocket artillery
Salvo weapons
Self-propelled artillery of Argentina
Multiple rocket launchers
Fabricaciones Militares